"Nightmare Scenario" may refer to:

Medicine 
 Sleep disorder, stress dreams

Music 
 The American punk rock band "New Bomb Turks"